Noel A. Cuevas  (born October 2, 1991) is a Puerto Rican former professional baseball outfielder who played in Major League Baseball (MLB) for the Colorado Rockies.

Career

Los Angeles Dodgers
Cuevas was drafted by the Los Angeles Dodgers in the 21st round of the 2010 Major League Baseball draft out of Universidad Interamericana in San Juan, Puerto Rico.

After a brief appearance (3 games) with the Arizona League Dodgers in 2010, he began 2011 with the Ogden Raptors of the Pioneer League (baseball), where he hit .285 in 60 games. He also appeared in 23 games with the Rancho Cucamonga Quakes, but hit just .220 with them. In 2012, he played 23 games in the Arizona League, 13 in the Pioneer League and 50 in the Midwest League with the Great Lakes Loons. Overall, he hit .267. In 2014, he spent the entire season with the Quakes and hit .284 with 12 homers and 66 RBI in 123 games. He made the mid-season California League all-star team. He was promoted in 2014 to the AA Chattanooga Lookouts of the Southern League and hit .231 in 131 games.

Colorado Rockies
On December 16, 2014, he was traded to the Colorado Rockies as the player to be named later in the previous trade that sent pitcher Juan Nicasio to the Dodgers. He spent the 2015 season with the Double-A New Britain Rock Cats, slashing .264/.305/.355 in 112 games. He split the 2016 season between the Triple-A Albuquerque Isotopes and the Double-A Hartford Yard Goats, batting .296/.331/.414 with 3 home runs and 35 RBI. In 2017, Cuevas posted a .312/.353/.487 batting line with career-highs in home runs (15) and RBI (79). The Rockies added Cuevas to their 40-man roster on November 7, 2017. He was called up to the majors for the first time on April 22, 2018, and made his debut that day. He finished his rookie season hitting .233/.268/.315 with 2 home runs and 10 RBI in 75 games. He only made one appearance for Colorado in 2019, spending the majority of the season in Triple-A. On September 3, 2019, Cuevas was designated for assignment. He was outrighted to Triple-A Albuquerque on September 6. On November 4, 2019, Cuevas elected free agency.

Chicago Cubs
On January 22, 2020, Cuevas signed a minor league deal with the Chicago Cubs organization. Cuevas was released by the Cubs organization on May 28, 2020.

References

External links

1991 births
Living people
People from Camuy, Puerto Rico
Major League Baseball players from Puerto Rico
Major League Baseball outfielders
Liga de Béisbol Profesional Roberto Clemente outfielders
Colorado Rockies players
Arizona League Dodgers players
Rancho Cucamonga Quakes players
Ogden Raptors players
Criollos de Caguas players
Great Lakes Loons players
Indios de Mayagüez players
Chattanooga Lookouts players
New Britain Rock Cats players
Albuquerque Isotopes players
Hartford Yard Goats players
Salt River Rafters players
Tiburones de Aguadilla players
Cañeros de Los Mochis players
Atenienses de Manatí (baseball) players